The Salvio Pacheco Adobe is a historic adobe house in Concord, California. It was built in 1835 by Salvio Pacheco, a Californio ranchero with vast lands in Contra Costa.

History

In 1834, Salvio Pacheco was awarded the Rancho Monte del Diablo Mexican land grant, including what is now known as Concord and parts of Pleasant Hill. On June 24, 1835, he completed this two-story adobe, the first building to be erected in Diablo Valley. 

Pacheco gave the land surrounding this adobe to the refugees of the earthquake-flood of 1868, and the community—previously known as Todos Santos—became known as Concord.

See also
 National Register of Historic Places listings in Contra Costa County, California
 Don Francisco Galindo House

References

External links

 Salvio Pacheco Adobe - Concord Historic Society
 State of California Landmarks List
  California Landmark 515 at NoeHill

Houses in Contra Costa County, California
Buildings and structures in Concord, California